Nenfro is a volcanic rock, gray tuff or banded trachyte (Brocchi) or leucite phonolite lava (Rosenbusch) with a soft but compact structure, typical of the Viterbo region that the Etruscans used in their sculptures of northern Lazio Cimini hills near Rome, Italy.

 The Winged Lion of Vulci, in the Louvre
 The Centaur of Vulci, preserved in the Villa Giulia in Rome
 The sarcophagus of Laris Pulena MS 3488 of Civita Musarna.
 The sarcophagi figured at the galleries and the entrance to the Tarquinia National Museum

One of its features is to take a pinkish tint when drying.

References 

Etruscan sculptures
Volcanic rocks
Viterbo
Lazio